José Gerardo Ulloa Arévalo (born 19 October 1996) is a Mexican road and mountain bike racing cyclist.

Major results

2013
 1st  Cross-country, National Junior Championships
 1st  Cross-country, Pan American Junior Championships
2014
 1st  Cross-country, Pan American Junior Championships
2016
 2nd  Cross-country, Pan American Under-23 Championships
2017
 Pan American Championships
1st  Under-23 Cross-country
1st  Team relay
 1st  Cross-country, National Under-23 Championships
2018
 Pan American Championships
1st  Under-23 Cross-country
3rd  Team relay
 1st  Cross-country, Central American and Caribbean Games
 UCI Under-23 XCO World Cup
3rd Mont-Sainte-Anne
2019
 1st  Cross-country, Pan American Games
 1st  Cross-country, National Championships
 2nd  Cross-country, Pan American Championships
2020
 1st  Cross-country, National Championships
 UCI XCC World Cup
1st Nové Město
2021
 National Championships
1st  Cross-country
1st  Short track
2022
 Pan American Championships
1st  Short track
1st  Team relay
2nd  Cross-country
 UCI XCC World Cup
2nd Mont-Sainte-Anne

Road
2018
 8th Overall Vuelta a Michoacán
1st  Young rider classification
1st Stage 3
2020
 2nd Road race, National Road Championships
2021
 1st   Overall El Tour de Tucson

References

1996 births
Living people
Mexican male cyclists
Pan American Games medalists in cycling
Pan American Games gold medalists for Mexico
Cyclists at the 2019 Pan American Games
Central American and Caribbean Games medalists in cycling
Central American and Caribbean Games gold medalists for Mexico
Competitors at the 2018 Central American and Caribbean Games
Sportspeople from Guadalajara, Jalisco
Medalists at the 2019 Pan American Games
Cyclists at the 2014 Summer Youth Olympics
Cyclists at the 2020 Summer Olympics
Olympic cyclists of Mexico
21st-century Mexican people